Petticoat Pirates is a 1961 British comedy film directed by David MacDonald and starring Charlie Drake, Anne Heywood, Cecil Parker, John Turner and Thorley Walters. The film had its premiere on 30 November 1961 at the Warner Theatre in London's West End.

Wren Officer Anne Heywood and the 150 girls under her command are piqued. On the grounds that Wrens can do anything that men can do, at least as well or better, they demand the right to serve at sea in warships. When their request is turned down by the authorities they board a frigate, imprison the skeleton crew,  and set off to sea, where they unintentionally become embroiled in a training exercise between British and US fleets...

Cast

Reception
According to Kinematograph Weekly the film was considered a "money maker" at the British box office in 1962.

References

External links

1961 films
1961 comedy films
Films shot at Associated British Studios
Films directed by David MacDonald (director)
British comedy films
Military humor in film
Seafaring films
1960s English-language films
1960s British films